Euchre or eucre is a trick-taking card game commonly played in Australia, Canada, New Zealand, Great Britain, and the Midwestern United States. It is played with a deck of 24, 28, or 32 standard playing cards. Normally there are four players, two on each team, although there are variations for two to nine players.

Euchre emerged in the United States in the early 19th century. While there are several theories regarding its origin, the most likely is that it derives from an old Alsatian game called Jucker. Euchre was subsequently responsible for introducing the joker into the modern deck of cards, first appearing in Euchre packs in the 1850s.

Origins and popularity

Eucre is briefly mentioned as early as 1810 by Piomingo, a "headman and warrior of the Muscogulgee Nation", being played in a gaming house alongside all fours, loo, cribbage and whist. In 1829, uker was being played with bowers on a steamboat in the American Mid-West. However, the earliest rules do not appear until 1844. 

The mode of play and terminology of Euchre have resulted in several theories that variously suggest it has an origin in either Spanish Trionfo, French Ecarté or Triomphe or Alsatian Jucker.

An early American theory was that Euchre was brought into the United States by the early German settlers of Pennsylvania, and from that region was disseminated throughout the nation. The 1864 edition of The American Hoyle disputes its alleged German heritage, tracing the game's origin to Pennsylvania itself in the 1820s. It goes on to surmise that a "rich German farmer's daughter" had visited Philadelphia and carried home a confused memory of Écarté, which then developed into Euchre.

Yet another theory is that Euchre may have been introduced to America by immigrants from the counties of Cornwall or Devon in southwest England, where it remains a hugely popular game. Euchre was introduced into Devon in turn by French prisoners of The Napoleonic Wars, imprisoned in Dartmoor Prison between 1805 and 1816. American prisoners were also housed there, after the Anglo-American War of 1812.

By contrast, card game historian David Parlett, who wrote in 2006 on "the origins of Euchre", believes that Euchre derives from an eighteenth-century Alsatian card game named Jucker or Juckerspiel. Apart from the name itself which, in German is pronounced "yooker", clues to a possible German origin are the names of the trump Jacks – Bower is phonetically identical with the German word Bauer which normally means farmer, but also refers to the Jack in playing cards. Another word probably derived from German is 'march', which is the literal translation of Marsch, itself an abbreviation of Durchmarsch and the German for a slam in many card games. 

There is no Joker in the earliest rules of 1844; instead 32 cards are used and the Right Bower, the trump Jack, is the "commanding card" with the Left Bower, the Jack of the same color, as the second-highest card. According to card game historian, David Parlett, the Joker was added to a 32-card pack in the 1850s specifically for the game of Euchre and is first mentioned in a set of rules in 1868 where it turns out to be a blank specimen card not intended for actual play. This gave rise to a variant called "Euchre with the Joker" in which the blank card ranked above all the rest. It must have been in use even earlier, however, since the term "Best Bower" appears in a satirical 1861 piece about the American Civil War. Later the Joker was embellished with a motif and specifically intended for use as the top trump. It was later transferred to the game of Poker and initially called the Mistigris.

In the late 19th century Euchre was regarded as the national card game of the United States. It has since declined in popularity, although it retains a strong following in regions such as the Midwest.

Euchre has also been described as Canada's national card game.

However, with the rise of 20th century games like Contract Bridge and Spades, Euchre has declined in popularity, though it is still played as a social game in the US Mid-West, Ontario, Australia, New Zealand and in Great Britain, especially Cornwall.

Rules

Deal 
Euchre is a four-player trump game, wherein the players are paired to form two partnerships. Sometimes, a 32-card Piquet or Skat deck is used, which includes the s and s.

Each player is dealt five cards (seven if using the 32-card deck) in clockwise order in two rounds.  The first player (one of the dealer's opponents) is dealt three cards (four if using the 32-card deck), the second two (three if using the 32-card deck), continually alternating until the dealer has three cards; after which a further batch of cards is dealt to each player to bring everyone's hand to five cards. In some variations of the game, the first player is dealt six cards, the second player is dealt four cards, and so on, until all players' hands contain five cards. A "cut" is sometimes offered by the dealer to the player to the right. In some variations, the cut must be requested.  The player offered the cut may knock the deck or the table to refuse the cut.

The remaining four cards (or five if using the Joker) are called the "kitty" and are placed face down in front of the dealer. The top card of the kitty is turned face up, and bidding begins. The dealer asks each player in turn if he or she would like the suit of the top card to be trump; the player responds either "pick it up" or "pass". If the choice comes around to the dealer, the dealer can either pick the card up or flip it over. If the dealer acquires the top card (either by being ordered to pick it up or choose to pick it up), the top card becomes part of the dealer's hand, and the dealer then discards a card to the kitty, face down. If no one orders up the top card and the dealer also chooses not to pick it up, each player is then given the opportunity, in turn, to call a different suit as trump. If no trump is selected, the hand is discarded and the deal is passed clockwise, or it may be a house rule to force the dealer to choose.

When a suit is named trump, the jack in the suit of the same color becomes a member of this trump suit. Any card of that (expanded) suit outranks any card of a non-trump suit. The highest-ranking card in Euchre is the jack of the trump suit and is called the "right bower" or "right"; the other jack of the same color is called the "left bower" or "left".

Example
Assume a hand is dealt and that spades are named as trump. In this event, the trump cards are as follows, from highest-ranking to lowest:
  (top card),  (right bower),  (left bower), 

The  becomes a spade during the playing of this hand. This expands the spade's suit to the seven cards named above and reduces the suit of clubs by one card (its jack being loaned to the trump suit). Once the hand is finished, the  ceases to be a spade and becomes a club again unless spades are again named as trump during the playing of a subsequent hand.

Play

Overview, objective, and scoring
When naming a suit, a player asserts that their partnership intends to win the majority of tricks of the hand. A single point is scored when the bid succeeds, and two points are scored if the team that declared trump takes all five tricks (called a "march"). A failure of the calling partnership to win three tricks is referred to as being "euchred", and that partnership is penalized by giving the opposing partnership two points.

A caller with exceptionally good cards can "go alone", thus seeking to win the march without a partner. The partner of a caller in a lone hand does not play, and if the caller achieves the march, the winning team scores 4 points. If only three or four of the tricks are taken while going alone, then only one point is scored. If euchred while playing alone, the opposing team still only receives 2 points.

The primary rule to remember when playing Euchre is that one is never required to play the trump suit (unless that is the one that is led), but one is required to follow suit if possible. (e.g., if diamonds are led, a player with diamonds is required to play a diamond.)  Failure to do this is called reneging (see below).

Calling round (naming trump)
Once the cards are dealt and the top card on the kitty is turned over, the upturned card's suit is offered as a trump to the players in clockwise order beginning with the player to the left of the dealer (called the "eldest"). Team members are generally discouraged or explicitly forbidden to discuss their preferred choice(s) of trump, covered by the rules forbidding table talk. A player wishing the proposed suit to be named trump, orders up the card and the dealer adds that card to his or her hand. It is usually more advantageous to the dealer's team to select trump in this way, as the dealer necessarily gains one trump card. The dealer must then also discard a card face down to return his or her hand to a total of five cards. This discard is an important tactical decision, as the dealer, lacking any cards of a particular suit, can potentially create a "void" or "short suit" in their hand. That would allow him to play a trump card instead of being forced to follow that voided suit when it is led (see the later section on winning tricks and "two-suited" in the Terminology section). If the player instead opts to pass, the option proceeds to the player to the left until either a player orders the card up or all players have passed.

If all players pass, the top card is turned face down and that suit may no longer be chosen as trump. Trump selection proceeds clockwise beginning with the player to the left of the dealer, where the player may name a suit different from that of the previous up-card as trump or may pass. No card is ordered up in this round. If all players pass again, it is declared a misdeal. The deal passes to the player on the previous dealer's left, who reshuffles and deals a new hand. (A variation called "Stick the Dealer", also referred to as "hanging" or "screwing" the dealer, is sometimes played, where the dealer is forced to call trump in this situation.)

The team that selects trump is known as the "makers" for the remainder of the hand, and the opposing team is known as the "defenders". The makers must take at least three of the five tricks in the hand in order to avoid being euchred.

Winning tricks
The player to the dealer's left begins play by leading any card of any suit, including trumps. Play continues in clockwise order; players follow suit if they hold a card of the led suit. The left bower is considered a member of the trump suit and not a member of its native suit.

The player who played the highest card of the suit led wins the trick unless a trump is played; then the highest trump card wins the trick. A player who plays neither the suit led nor trump cannot win the trick. The player who won the trick collects the played cards from the table, turns the cards face down, and then leads to the next trick.

After all five rounds have been played, the hand is scored. The player to the left of the previous dealer then deals the next hand, and the deal moves clockwise around the table until one partnership scores 10 points and wins the game.

Going alone
If the player bidding and making trump has an exceptionally good hand, that player has the option of playing without their partner and partner's cards. If that player then wins all five tricks, the team scores four points.

"Going alone" is initiated at the time the bidder orders the upturned card on the kitty to the dealer or names a suit. The bidder signifies their desire to play alone by saying so after bidding. The bidder must make this call before play begins. During a loner or lone hand, the bidder's partner discards their cards and does not participate in the play of the hand. In some regional variants (see below), if the dealer's partner "calls them up"/"orders it up" (on the turned-up card), the partner is obliged to go alone for that hand.

Defending alone: If a player chooses to make trump, the defending team can choose to go alone. If all five tricks are taken by the defending team or the person who has called the suit is bumped, the defending team will receive 6 points. In most Canadian variations this is not allowed and only the team making trump may decide to "go alone".

The odds of success of a lone hand depend on the lay of the cards and the inactive cards held by the bidder's partner. Nine cards out of twenty-four do not participate in play, making the hand less predictable than it would be otherwise. A hand consisting of the top five cards of the trump suit is unbeatable from any position; this is sometimes referred to as a "lay-down", as a player with such a hand may often simply lay all five cards on the table at once.

Scoring

The first team to score 10 points (or 5, 7, 11, or 15 points in some variations of the game) wins the game. Some players choose to play "win by two" where there is no winner until a team has at least 10 points and 2 points more than the other team. Winning a game 10–0 is known as "skunking" in the US.

Scorekeeping markers

Scores can be kept by using two otherwise unused cards as markers, with each team often using cards of the same color.

Scoring begins using one card face up, covered by the other card face down. Upon winning points, the top card is moved to reveal the appropriate number of suit symbols on the bottom card. After all points are revealed on the lower card, the top card is flipped over, adding pips on both cards to indicate the score.

Scoring starts with counting the symbols on the cards, for points 1 to 4; at 5, the cards are turned over and crossed. Crossing the cards indicates 5 points. Points 6 to 9 are counted similarly by counting the number of suit symbols showing and adding them to the 5 when the cards are crossed.

In Canada and Michigan, it is common for each team to use two s of the same color to keep score, with one team red and the other black. The s are usually referred to as "counting cards" in this situation.

Betting
Betting takes place after the trump is determined, but before the first card is led to the first trick. Betting can start with an ante or forced bet. The defenders can either check on the bid and bid nothing, thereby likely losing their ante; call the bid; or – if they feel confident that they can Euchre – raise the bid. Once a bet has been settled by a call on the bid, the hand plays out, with the winners of the bet adding that bet to their pot. After a game has been won, the winning team then splits the pot between the two winners, and the game can end. Some variants can be played over multiple games.

Betting in Euchre can also be done on a per-trick basis or a per-point basis. At the end of the game, the losing team owes the winning team the difference in points based on the monetary value set per point.

Table talk
Communicating with one's partner to influence their play, called table talk or cross-boarding, is considered cheating. This can include code words, secret gestures, or other forms of cooperative play. Depending on house rules, table talk can result in replaying of a hand or awarding of a point to the team calling out the infraction.

Reneging
If a player does not follow suit when able (usually by playing a trump card instead), it is considered a renege (or revoke), and the opposing team is awarded two points if it is caught in later tricks of the same hand or two points can be deducted from the offending team. While such mis-plays are often unintentional—for example, where a player misreads some of their cards, most commonly by misinterpreting the left bower as being of its native suit—they are still callable by opponents as reneging. In some variants, reneging when a player or their opponent is going alone may result in a penalty of four points, equally applicable to the maker of trump and the opposing team, in order to equalize the potential values of a hand. Usually, reneging on purpose is considered cheating and is strongly discouraged among communities that consider cheating or lying to be unethical. Players caught repeatedly reneging on purpose are often ostracized from future card-playing events.

Variations

Euchre is a game with a large number of variant versions. They include versions for two to nine players, as well as changes in cards used, bidding, play, and scoring.

No trump: After the first round (once the kitty's top card has been turned down), "no trump" may be called. In the ensuing tricks, there is no trump suit and jacks have no special significance, with normal deck order (ace high) taking precedence.

Stick the dealer or screw the dealer: The dealer must call trump at the end of the second round and is unable to declare a misdeal. This variation is often used to keep the game moving quickly by forcing the players to play a hand none of them wants to play.

Going under or bottoms or farmer's hand: A player with a hand with at least three  or  cards can exchange three of these cards with the three unknown cards in the kitty. This must be performed before trump has been selected.

Another variant of the "farmer's hand" rules states that if a player receiving all s and s  may call for a redeal. The dealer may not exercise this option (because the dealer picks up the card from the kitty).

Point on partner: When a partner steals their own partner's deal successfully, in addition to retaining the deal, the team is also awarded one point.

In some variations, a player may not call trump with only a jack but must have another card of the same suit to do so. Sometimes this only applies to the dealer, and if a player is caught doing this, it is often treated as a renege.

Robson rules: When a team wins all five tricks (normally or by going alone), they may choose to reduce the opposing team's score (by two or four, respectively) instead of adding to their own score. Additionally, if the dealer turns up a jack on the kitty, they may elect to go alone without seeing the rest of their hand. If all tricks are won via this "blind loner" hand, five points are awarded instead of the usual four; but a failure to win all tricks earns the defenders one point. This ruleset was named for four-time Northern Michigan regional tournament runner-up champion James Robson.

No ace, no face, no trump: a player dealt a hand which, once trump is called contains no aces, face cards, or the suit which is trump, may reveal this hand before cards have been played, stating "no ace, no face, no trump"; and all players must throw their cards in and the hand is re-dealt.

Three-handed Euchre: A variant for three players, three-handed Euchre is played like 24-card Euchre, with the following changes:
 Players play alone, rather than in teams.
 Each player plays to ten points and keeps their own score (using s and s as markers)
 Seven cards are dealt to each player, leaving three in the kitty (the top card is turned up).
 The person who makes trump is the "maker". Both other players are "defenders", but compete with each other for tricks.
 If the maker takes four tricks, they receive one point. If the maker takes six tricks, they receive two points. Taking all seven tricks gives the maker four points.
 If the maker does not take four tricks, they are euchred (set). The defender who took the most tricks will then receive two points. If both defenders took an equal number of tricks, they each receive one point.

Ace no face: a player dealt a hand that contains any number of aces but no face cards, may lay this hand on the table and call "ace no face". This is considered a misdeal, and all the cards are gathered and re-dealt.

Canadian / Ontario rules: Standard rules, except that the dealer's partner who orders a card up must go it alone.

Many of these variations are specific to a particular region. In Australia and New Zealand, playing to eleven rather than ten points is common. In southwestern England, Cornwall, and Guernsey, variations with a joker as highest trump are played. In Ontario, parts of New Zealand, and in the British and Australian versions of the game, after the dealer turns up the top card on the kitty if the first player to the left passes and the dealer's partner would like to order up the dealer, the dealer's partner must play alone.

Terminology
Euchre terminology varies greatly from region to region and is highly colloquial. Some examples include:
 Ace No Face: Similar to "farmers hand". In Ace No Face the player must have one  and all s and s in their hand. The player then calls "ace no face" and exchanges three of their cards for the bottom three (must be called before the first card of the beginning trick has been led).
 Bump or getting "euchred" or "set": Occurs when the opposing team wins more tricks than the team who called the suit.
 Euchre Bustle: Name for a Euchre tournament (used in northern Midwest of United States).
 Farmer's Hand, Poor Man's Hand, Bottom Hand, Grandma's Hand: Certain weak hands (usually those containing no s or face cards (s, s, or s), but only s and s), are designated as "farmer's hands" or "bottoms". After inspecting the hand dealt, a player may call out "farmer's hand" and is then allowed to show the cards in question and exchange three of them for the three unexposed cards in the kitty (also called "going under" or "under the table").
It is also called a Loner, or Lone Wolf, because a player with such a hand will typically opt to go alone. It may also refer to any set of cards that are often played when the player knows they will win all the tricks they lay for. This, however, may only be done within the same suit without giving up a slight advantage to the other players.
 Loner Range: When a team reaches 6 points they are referred to as in "Loner Range" because they need 4 or fewer points (a successful going-alone is worth 4 points) to reach 10 points and win a game. Alternatively, it can also be used to describe being 4 points away from the opposing team. For example, when it is 4 to 8, the losing team is in "Loner Range" below the winning team.
 Screw the Dealer, or Stick the Dealer: An optional rule that states that if trump is not called it must be called by the dealer, who is last to act. Mainly used as a method to speed up the game, as it eliminates throw-in hands.
 Throwing in: Because winning four of the five tricks is no better than winning three, it is often customary for the leading player of the offensive team to throw the remainder of their cards into the center once three tricks have been assured but five tricks are impossible. This is because one trick has already been won by the opposing team or they are certain that all the tricks cannot be won. (e.g. a right bower was ordered up but has not been played once three tricks have been won) The cards are thrown face up to show the opposing team the inevitability of their winning three tricks or the impossibility of winning all.
 Trump the Partner: Refers to a situation where the last player plays the card that wins a trick that their partner would have otherwise won. It usually refers to a situation where the partner has an  that follows suit and the player plays a trump card but plays a higher trump or non-trump than the partner's qualifies.
 In the Barn (also called Barn Doors): A term used in the Midwest United States for having nine points, being one away from winning.

See also
Euchre variants - other forms of Euchre
Euchre variations - minor changes to standard Euchre
Bid Euchre - a variant form
Haus - a variant popular in upstate New York
Glossary of card game terms

Footnotes

References

Bibliography
Books
 
 
 
 
 
 
 
 
 Parlett, David (1991). A History of Card Games. Oxford: OUP. 
 Parlett, David (1992). [https://www.worldcat.org/oclc/24847073 A Dictionary of Card Games. Oxford: OUP. 
 Parlett, David (2007). "The Origins of Euchre" in The Playing-Card, Vol. 35, No. 4 (April–June 2007), pp. 255–261.
 Porter, Ian (2010). "Classifying Non-standard Playing Cards" in The Playing-Card, Vol. 38, No. 3 (Jan–Mar 2010). pp. 203–208. 
 
 
 
 
 
 Piomingo (1810). The Savage. Philadelphia: Thomas S. Manning
Websites
 
 
 Keller, John William (1887). The Game of Euchre. NY: F.A. Stokes

External links

Historical rulesets
History at parlettgames.uk
 The Law and Practice of the Game of Euchre - Philadelphia, 1862

Current rulesets
Euchre at pagat.com. 
Rules at bicyclecards.com
Rules at Ohio Euchre.Com
CCA Euchre Rules at ccasports.com
Rules of the Chicago Sport & Social Club.

19th-century card games
 
Four-player card games
Year of introduction missing
Canadian card games